UCLA Extension Writers' Program is a unit within UCLA Extension, the not-for-profit and self-supporting community outreach arm of the University of California, Los Angeles. Located in the Westwood Village area of Los Angeles, the UCLA Extension Writers' Program offers approximately 400 annual open-enrollment screenwriting and creative writing courses for all levels of writers. Courses are available online and on the UCLA campuses in downtown Los Angeles and Woodland Hills. All courses are approved by the UCLA Academic Senate.

History
The Regents of the University of California established University Extension in 1891. A permanent Extension office was opened in Los Angeles in 1917. Extension moved to the UCLA campus in 1948, and subsequently to its location at Gayley and LeConte in 1971. The UCLA Extension Writers' Program was established in 1966.

Dr. Linda Venis served as the Director of the Writers' Program from August 1986 until June 2016, when she retired. In October 2016, Charles Jensen was hired to head up the Program.

Program
The Writers' Program offers approximately 400 annual onsite and online courses including beginning, intermediate, and advanced-level courses in fiction, memoir, personal essay, poetry, playwriting, editing, publishing, and screenwriting. Courses are taught by a roster of more than 200 published or produced writing professionals.

Students may choose from five certificate programs (Fiction, Creative Nonfiction, Feature Film Writing, Television Writing and Film and TV Comprehensive) for a structured course of study, as well as four specializations for a focused approach to a specific topic. The James Kirkwood Literary Prize was established in 1991 in memory of James Kirkwood to honor the literary achievements of new generations of fiction writers. The UCLA Extension Screenplay Competition replaced the Diane Thomas Screenwriting Award in 2006.

In 2014, the Writers' Program established the Allegra Johnson Prize, a merit-based award with a prize of $5,000. The award is given to a promising novelist or memoirist in alternating years, providing both formal recognition of their talent and financial resources to support them as they complete their manuscripts.

Books
In 2013, Gotham Books published two books that were edited by then-Writers' Program Director Linda Venis and written by Writers' Program instructors. The books are Cut to the Chase: Writing Feature Films with the Pros at UCLA Extension Writers' Program and Inside the Room: Writing Television with the Pros at UCLA Extension Writers' Program.

Notable instructors 
Writers' Program instructors are professional writers. Some of the Program's notable instructors have included:
 Shauna Barbosa, poetry
 Francesca Lia Block, fiction and writing for young readers
 Alyx Dellamonica, fiction
 Robert Eversz, fiction
 Richard Hatem, screenwriting
 Kevin Kelton, screenwriting
 Shawna Kenney, nonfiction
 Caroline Leavitt, fiction
 Ben Loory, fiction
 Suzanne Lummis, poetry
 Lou Mathews, fiction
 Nancy Nigrosh, screenwriting
 Mark Sarvas, fiction
 Jule Selbo, screenwriting
 Brittany and Brianna Winner, screenwriting and fiction

Student success stories
Many of UCLA Extension Writers' Program students have published or produced work after leaving the program, including:
 Stuart Beattie, G.I. Joe: The Rise of Cobra; Australia; Pirates of the Caribbean: The Curse of the Black Pearl; 30 Days of Night; Collateral
 Karen E. Bender, author of Refund: Stories
 Michelle Bitting, author of poetry collections Notes to the Beloved; Good Friday Kiss; Blue Laws
 Octavia E. Butler, science fiction author and winner of Hugo and Nebula awards and a MacArthur Fellowship
 Hillary Carlip, author of Queen of the Oddballs; Girl Power: Young Women Speak Out
 Tucker Cawley, Parks and Recreation, Everybody Loves Raymond
 Pauline W. Chen, author of Final Exam
 Zoanne Clack, Grey's Anatomy
 Bryan Cogman, Game of Thrones
 Lindy DeKoven, author of Primetime Princess
 Eric Jerome Dickey, Resurrecting Midnight
 Doug Ellin, Entourage
 Lee Eisenberg, Hello Ladies: The Movie; The Office; Bad Teacher; Year One
 Maria Amparo Escandón, author of Esperanza's Box of Saints; screenwriter of Santitos
 Janet Fitch, White Oleander (Oprah Pick)
 James Franco, author of Palo Alto: Stories
 Christina García, author of Dreaming in Cuban
 Tod Goldberg, author of Gangsterland; Living Dead Girl; Burn Notice
 Al Gough and Miles Millar, screenwriters of Spider-man 2; Shanghai Noon; Smallville; Lethal Weapon 4
 Sue Grafton, author of the Kinsey Millhone series
 Reyna Grande, author of Across a Hundred Mountains; Dancing with Butterflies; The Distance Between Us
 Drew Z. Greenberg, screenwriter/producer, Dexter; Smallville; Buffy the Vampire Slayer; The O.C.
 Gavin Hood, Tsotsi (Academy Award winner, Best Foreign Film)
 Tara Ison, author of Stories; A Child Out of Alcatraz
 James Kirkwood, Pulitzer Prize- and Tony Award-winning playwright, A Chorus Line
 Harley Jane Kozak, author of Dating Dead Men; Dating Is Murder; Dead Ex; A Date You Can't Refuse
 Chad Kultgen, author of The Average American Male; The Lie; Men, Women, and Children
 Laila Lalami, author of The Moor's Account (Pulitzer Prize finalist) and The Other Americans (National Book Award Finalist)
 Rob Reid, author of Year Zero
 Melissa Rosenberg, adaptation of Twilight, Dexter, Boston Public, Jessica Jones
 Randi Mayem Singer, Mrs. Doubtfire
 J. Ryan Stradal, author of Kitchens of the Great Midwest
 Earl W. Wallace, Witness (Academy Award winner for Best Original Screenplay)
 Joseph Wambaugh, The Onion Field
 Kevin Williamson, Scream, Dawson's Creek
 Iris Yamashita, Letters from Iwo Jima (Academy Award nominee for Best Original Screenplay)

References

External links
UCLA Extension Writers' Program

University of California, Los Angeles
1966 establishments in California